"This Love" is a song by the American pop rock band Maroon 5. The song was released on January 12, 2004, as the second single from their debut album Songs About Jane (2002). 

The track is built around a piano-led strut and a repeating guitar sound. The lyrics are based on the band's lead vocalist Adam Levine's break-up with an ex-girlfriend. He revealed that the song was written in the "most emotionally trying time" in his life. He has also described the lyrics of this song as being extremely erotic. "This Love" was critically acclaimed by music critics, who noted the track's musicscape.

The song entered the top ten on most charts, topping several of Billboard magazine's component charts, including reaching the number one spot on the Hot Adult Top 40 Tracks chart. The music video met with controversy, regarding extended intimate scenes between Levine and his girlfriend. "This Love" helped Maroon 5 win the MTV Video Music Award for Best New Artist and was the third-most-played song of 2004. The live version of the song won Best Pop Performance by a Duo or Group with Vocals at the 2006 Grammy Awards. "This Love" is one of Maroon 5's most successful singles.

Background 
"This Love" was the second single from Maroon 5's 2002 debut album, Songs About Jane. In an interview with MTV News in August 2002, Levine revealed that he wrote the song the day his girlfriend moved away after they broke up. In another interview, Levine revealed that the song was written in the "most emotionally trying time" in his life. He also added, "I was in a relationship that was ending, but I was really excited on the other end because the band was about to go make the record and I was ecstatic to go in the studio. She was literally leaving town within days of me writing the lyrics to 'This Love', so I was in prime emotional condition to write a song with that kind of conflict."

Music and lyrics 
During development of "This Love", the band stated that the song was influenced by musician Stevie Wonder. The piece was written in the key of C minor, the metre is set in common time, and the piece's tempo is a moderate 95 beats per minute. The introduction of "This Love" features a piano-led strut. Maroon 5 has called "This Love" a prime pop-rock song. The music featured in the song has a lot more rock-guitar crunch, and is considered a soulful, pop rock and alternative rock song. According to Johnny Loftus of Allmusic, the music featured in the song has "a slick channeling of vintage R&B rhythms into punchy pop dynamics". Loftus felt that the song features "Levine's wry falsetto around strutting, bottom-heavy piano and percussion both programmed and live; chirping backup vocals and washes of sunny synth and flute acted as counterweights". Loftus also noted that the band has a "sexual charge" with the lyrics, "I tried my best to feed her appetite / To keep her coming every night / So hard to keep her satisfied". The Boston Globe's Steve Morse described the single's sounds as "a rocking yet soulful tale about the breakup of a relationship". Meghan Bard of The Daily Campus adds that the song has  "Stevie Wonder-esque vocals and a funky R&B beat". In the extended version of the song, which is 4 minutes and 26 seconds long, the chorus of the band's next single, "She Will Be Loved", can be heard from 3:21 to 3:42, during the outro.

In an interview with Rolling Stone, when asked about the lyrics "Keep her coming every night" and "Sinking my fingertips into every inch of you", Levine said: "Yep, that's sexual, all right. I was so sick of typical lyrics like 'Ooh, baby' and 'I love you' and all this vague shit. I thought the more explicit I got without being totally explicit was a nice approach. The little girls would enjoy them, and it would go right over my grandparents' heads. But it would hit my ex-girlfriend like a ton of bricks. It was perfect." He also comments on how MTV played an edited version of the song for the music video, with the word "coming" edited out of the line "keep her coming every night". Levine noted, "MTV has now edited the language. They won't let me say, 'Keep her coming every night', and they took the sinking out of 'sinking my fingertips'. It's like communist China. It's totally bizarre."

Reception 
The song received critical acclaim. In the Rolling Stone review of the album, critic Christian Hoard wrote: "Adam Levine's urban-romantic swoonings work best when his band really gets up on the good foot, as on 'This Love', which uses piano and James Brown-like guitars to create a foundation on which Levine can obsess about beauty (including his own)." Jason Thompson of PopMatters noted that on the songs "This Love" and "Must Get Out", keyboardist Jesse Carmichael "manages to conjure up both the productions of Britney Spears and The New Radicals respectively". Sam Beresky of the Daily Lobo, who was less enthusiastic about the album, complimented the band on "This Love", in which he noted, "...'This Love', is a happier version of the first with a great backbeat reminiscent of Stevie Wonder's 'Superstition'. It might make a foot tap, a head nod or even a booty shake if played at a loud volume."

In May 2004, musician John Mayer told Rolling Stone that he liked the band's album Songs About Jane. Mayer was also positive towards the song. "Once I heard 'This Love,' it was a light-fuse/stand-back kind of situation. It's one of those perfect songs you always hope to write." The single also strengthened Maroon 5's appeal, and helped position them as one of the year's break-out bands in 2004. It has since been remixed by Kanye West, titled "This Love (Kanye West remix)", in May 2004. The band released an EP titled 1.22.03.Acoustic, which features an acoustic version of "This Love."

"This Love" is widely considered to be one the band's best songs. In 2022, Billboard and American Songwriter both ranked the song number two on their lists of the 10 greatest Maroon 5 songs.

Chart performance 
"This Love" appeared on the Billboard Hot 100, peaking at No. 5. The track's Junior Vasquez Mixes remix topped the Billboard Hot Dance Music/Club Play chart. It also appeared in the Hot Dance Airplay chart at No. 18. "This Love" reached No. 1 on Billboard's Top 40 Mainstream. It also reached the top spot on Billboard's Hot Adult Top 40 Tracks at the No. 1 spot, it stayed there for 10 weeks. The song was the top digital download of 2004. In 2007, the song re-entered the chart at the No. 36 position on Billboard's Hot Digital Songs.  As of June 2014, the song has sold 2,120,000 copies in the US.

"This Love" reached the Top 10 in twelve countries. In the United Kingdom, it reached the No. 3 spot in the UK Singles Chart on May 1, 2004. It entered the top ten in France, Belgium, and Australia. The single reached the top five in Norway, Switzerland, Netherlands, Austria, and New Zealand. Elsewhere, "This Love" appeared on the Italy, Swiss, Germany, and Ireland music charts.

Music video 

The music video for "This Love" premiered on MTV's Total Request Live on January 6, 2004. Directed by Sophie Muller, the video combines performance footage from the band in a courtyard built at Mack Sennett Studios and scenes of Adam Levine parting ways with a woman.

According to Levine, the concept behind the music video was based on Prince. "An overt sexuality confuses people, too. That video was a very 'pop star' thing to do."

The music video also features Levine and his then-girlfriend, model Kelly McKee in a few intimate scenes. The video used creative camera angles, in an effort to avoid action from the Federal Communications Commission for television broadcasts. A version of the video where a stream of computer-generated flowers obscure the screen further was also created. When asked about the video, Levine said: "It was surprisingly not weird and surprisingly not sexual. It was totally comfortable. I didn't get horny or anything, which was weird since I shot it with my girlfriend."

The video was still seen as controversial, with Sylvia Patterson of The Daily Telegraph describing it as "a porno-pop video". Bass player Michael Madden, asked to comment on the video's reception, referred to the controversy as "an absurd over-reaction."

Live performances, other media and awards and nominations 

Maroon 5 performed "This Love" live on Saturday Night Live (SNL) in February 2004. The band won the MTV Video Music Award for Best New Artist for the music video of "This Love" in 2004. Also the same year, the song won for Choice Rock Track at the Teen Choice Awards. In the Nielsen Broadcast Data Systems, "This Love" was the third played song of 2004, having 438,589 total plays. At the 48th Grammy Awards, the song won a Grammy Award in the category for Best Pop Performance by a Duo or Group with Vocal.

"This Love" was featured on the 2004 film White Chicks and the television series Beat Shazam. The song appeared as a track in the Nintendo DS video game Guitar Hero: On Tour, as well as being a part of the downloadable content library for Guitar Hero 5 (and by association, Band Hero as they share the same catalog).

Charts

Weekly charts

Year-end charts

All-time charts

Sales and certifications

Release history

References 

2002 songs
2004 singles
Maroon 5 songs
Music video controversies
Music videos directed by Sophie Muller
A&M Octone Records singles
J Records singles
Number-one singles in the Czech Republic
Number-one singles in Greece
Number-one singles in Hungary
Songs written by Adam Levine
Songs written by James Valentine (musician)
Songs written by Jesse Carmichael